Lost in Transit (original title: Tombés du ciel; literally "Fallen from the Sky") is a 1993 French comedy-drama film directed by Philippe Lioret. The film is about a man who loses his passport and spends a couple of days at a Paris airport, where he meets four people in similar circumstances. The film won the Grand Prize at the 6th Yubari International Fantastic Film Festival held in February 1995. The film was inspired by the predicament of Mehran Karimi Nasseri.

Cast
 Jean Rochefort as Arturo Conti
 Marisa Paredes as Suzana, Arturo's wife
 Ticky Holgado as Serge
 Laura del Sol as Angela
 Sotigui Kouyaté as Knak
 Ismaïla Meite as Zola
 Jean-Louis Richard as Monsieur Armanet
 José Artur as Newspaper shop keeper
 Olivier Saladin as Restaurant manager
 Philippe Duquesne as C.R.S.
 François Morel as Policeman
 Claude Derepp as Bébert, policeman
 Jacques Mathou as Policeman
 Christian Sinniger as Policeman
 Yves Osmu as Policeman
 Dimitri Radochevitch as Bus driver
 Pierre LaPlace as Inspector

Accolades

See also
 Mehran Karimi Nasseri
 Flight, 1998 opera
 The Terminal, a 2004 film directed by Steven Spielberg, based on a similar story.
 List of people who have lived at airports

Notes

External links

 cinemovies.fr entry 

1993 films
1993 comedy-drama films
Films directed by Philippe Lioret
French comedy-drama films
1990s French-language films
Films about friendship
Films set in airports
1990s French films